The Ruhijha mine is a large open pit mine located in the eastern part of Uganda in Eastern Region. Ruhijha represents one of the largest tungsten reserves in Uganda having estimated reserves of 30 million tonnes of ore grading 0.5% tungsten.

See also 
Mining industry of Uganda

References 

Tungsten mines in Uganda